Stelios Benardis (born 1907, date of death unknown) was a Greek athlete. He competed in the decathlon at the 1924 Summer Olympics and the 1928 Summer Olympics.

References

External links
 

1907 births
Year of death missing
Athletes (track and field) at the 1924 Summer Olympics
Athletes (track and field) at the 1928 Summer Olympics
Greek male sprinters
Greek male pole vaulters
Greek decathletes
Olympic athletes of Greece
Place of birth missing
Olympic decathletes
20th-century Greek people